Sico ( 758 – 832) was the Lombard Prince of Benevento from the 817 to his own death.

Before becoming the Prince of Benevento, he had been the gastald of Acerenza. On the assassination of Grimoald IV, Sico succeeded to the princely throne. He made the same empty pledges of tribute and fealty to the Emperor Louis the Pious which Grimoald had made.

Sico tried to extend the principality at the expense of Byzantium. He besieged Naples at an unknown date (perhaps c. 831), but could not take the city. He did, however, remove the body of the Neapolitan patron saint, Januarius, who was originally from Benevento. It was also Sico who founded a line of rulers at Capua by bestowing that ancient fortress on Landulf I as gastald. Landulf honoured his benefactor by naming his first castle Sicopolis.

Children
When Sico died he was succeeded by his son Sicard. His daughter Itta (also spelled Ita or Itana) married Guy I, Duke of Spoleto. Sico is sometimes numbered "Sico I" and Sico of Salerno is numbered "Sico II".

References

750s births
832 deaths
Year of birth uncertain
Lombard warriors
Princes of Benevento
9th-century rulers in Europe
9th-century Lombard people